The Burnt Hills are a mountain range in Santa Clara County, California.

References 

Mountain ranges of the San Francisco Bay Area
Mountain ranges of Santa Clara County, California
Mountain ranges of Northern California